Abdul Rehman Rana (ab-dur-reh-maan) (born 1 September 1942) is a Pakistani former politician and soldier from  Jaranwala, the city of Faisalabad, Punjab, Pakistan.

Personal life 
He was born on 1 September 1945 in Bikaner Rajasthan the state of India.  His father's name was Rana Abdulsittar and his mother's name was Ulfatt Begum.  He has one older brother whose name is DR ABDUL GHAFAR RANA .  He has three sisters, Arshad, Kalsoom, and Zikria.  In 1965, he was married to his cousin named Tasneem Rasheed. She is a doctor and they have five children.  One son and four daughters.  Rabail, Zanjbeel, Rakshnda, Umar and Afsheen.

Army career
He was a member of the Pakistani Army between 1968 and 1988. He retired with the rank of major.

Political career
He has been a Tehsil Nazim Municipal Administrator of Tehsil city or sub division Jaranwala. He became administrator for the first time by winning the elections in 2004 from Pakistan Muslim League Quied-e-Azam.  He was not just successful in his elections but also in his goals and agendas. He did a lot of construction work, made the sewerage system better and built new governmental official buildings. In the next election terms he did not get a seat from his party PML-Q. So he had to run in the election by himself, which was the major cause for him to lose the elections for next term for Tehsil Nazim.

In 2008 he was elected to the Provincial Assembly of the Punjab as a member of the Pakistan Peoples Party.

References

People from Bikaner
1942 births
Living people
Pakistan Army officers
Pakistan Muslim League (Q) politicians
Punjab MPAs 2008–2013
Punjabi people
Pakistan People's Party politicians